The 1962–63 UCLA Bruins men's basketball team was coached by John Wooden in his 15th year. The Bruins tied for first in the AAWU (7–5), and defeated Stanford in a one-game playoff for the berth in the NCAA tournament. They lost in their opener to Arizona State (79–93), but won ten national championships in the next thirteen years.

Roster

Schedule

|-
!colspan=9 style=|Regular Season

|-
!colspan=9 style=|AAWU Playoff

|-
!colspan=12 style="background:#;"| NCAA Tournament

Draft list

References 

 "2011–12 UCLA Bruins Men's Basketball Media Guide". University of California Los Angeles. Retrieved July 1, 2014.

UCLA Bruins
UCLA Bruins men's basketball seasons
UCLA Bruins
UCLA Bruins
Ucla